Beverley Redfern (born c.1956 in Mtarfa, Malta) is a British mountain runner who won the 1990 World Mountain Running Championships.

She also won the Ben Nevis Race in 1989, the Coniston Fell Race in 1993, and Sierre-Zinal, also in 1993.

Redfern still holds the women's course record for the Ben Lomond Hill Race which she set in 1990.

References

Living people
British female mountain runners
British fell runners
People from Mtarfa
Year of birth missing (living people)
World Mountain Running Championships winners